Myanmar participated at the 2006 Asian Games, held in Doha, Qatar from December 1 to December 15, 2006, ranked 27th in the medal tally.

Medalists

References

Nations at the 2006 Asian Games
2006 in Burmese sport